The 1930–31 season was the 33rd in the history of the Southern League. The league consisted of Eastern and Western Divisions. Dartford won the Eastern Division on goal average (had goal difference been used, Aldershot Town would have been champions) and Exeter City reserves won the Western Division. Dartford were declared Southern League champions after winning a championship play-off 7–2.

Two clubs from the Southern League applied to join the Football League, although neither were successful.

Eastern Division

A total of 9 teams contest the division, including 8 sides from previous season and one new team.

Newly elected team:
 Thames II - replaced its first team (which was elected to the Football League the previous year).

Western Division

A total of 12 teams contest the division, including 11 sides from previous season and one new team.

Team relegated from 1929–30 Football League:
 Merthyr Town

Football League election
Two Southern League clubs, Aldershot and Merthyr Town, applied to join the Football League, with Merthyr applying to join both Division Three North and Division Three South.

Third Division North

Third Division South

References

1930-31
4
1930–31 in Welsh football